Kaitlin Nobbs (born 24 September 1997) is an Australian field hockey player. She has played for the Australian national team, the Hockeyroos.

Early life
Nobbs is the daughter of Australian field hockey players Michael Nobbs and Lee Capes. Her father played in the 1984 Summer Olympics and coached the Indian men's team at the 2012 Summer Olympics, while her mother won the gold medal at the 1988 Summer Olympics. Her aunt Michelle Capes and uncle Mark Hager also represented Australia at field hockey at the Olympic Games. Nobbs has an older sister, Jaimee, who is a competitive figure skater.

Nobbs was born in Western Australia and lived there until the age of 14. She then moved to Newington, New South Wales. She graduated from Presbyterian Ladies' College, Sydney in 2015. She then began attending Curtin University where she studied nursing.

Career
In 2014, Nobbs played for her first professional hockey team, the New South Wales Arrows, part of the Australian Hockey League.

Nobbs received a scholarship to train alongside the national senior team ahead of the 2016 Summer Olympics, although she was not a full member of the senior team. Nobbs was selected to the 2016 Junior World Cup team. Nobbs won a bronze medal as part of the team. Also in 2016, Nobbs was named to the senior Australian women's national field hockey team, the Hockeyroos, for the first time. Nobbs was selected to replace Anna Flanagan ahead of a four-team tournament in Japan. Nobbs was again part of the Australian team when they won bronze at the 2017 Hawkes Bay tournament.

Nobbs won the 2015 Jeanette Buckham Award for Outstanding Individual Sportswoman and was named 2016 Burwood's Sportsperson of the Year.

Nobbs qualified for the Tokyo 2020 Olympics. She was part of the Hockeyroos Olympics squad. The Hockeyroos lost 1-0 to India in the quarterfinals and therefore were not in medal contention.

References

External links
 
 
 

Australian female field hockey players
Living people
Sportswomen from New South Wales
1997 births
Female field hockey midfielders
Commonwealth Games medallists in field hockey
Commonwealth Games silver medallists for Australia
Field hockey players at the 2018 Commonwealth Games
Field hockey players at the 2022 Commonwealth Games
Field hockey players at the 2020 Summer Olympics
Olympic field hockey players of Australia
20th-century Australian women
21st-century Australian women
Sportspeople from Sydney
Sportswomen from Western Australia
Field hockey players from Perth, Western Australia
Medallists at the 2018 Commonwealth Games
Medallists at the 2022 Commonwealth Games